The Bolivarian Library (Spanish: Biblioteca Bolivariana de Mérida) is a multipurpose building located in Mérida, Venezuela, which serves both as a reading room, exhibition hall and museum as a meeting place and as such it acquitted one of the sights of the city.

The Headquarters building is seen as a Modernist work of architecture in the heart of the colonial city, has a number of areas, in honor of the countries liberated by Simón Bolívar where located: reading room, computer room, exhibition and museum, while at exterior, or the street, is preceded by a small square, often used as a commercial area by local craftsmen.

History 

The library was opened in honor of the bicentennial of the birth of the "Libertador" Simón Bolívar in 1983. On its floor is home to several works related Bolívar, and various objects related to the colonial period and early years of independence. The building was built during the rule of former President Luis Herrera Campins, be that the work already completed.

The building occupies the site of what was once the Escuela Picón, the city of Mérida, who led an outstanding job for the collection of important goods such as books, historical documents, magazines and newspapers as the basis for research and entertainment of the merideños.

External links 
  Méridapreciosa, Biblioteca Bolivariana

Libraries in Venezuela
Organizations established in 1983
1983 establishments in Venezuela
Buildings and structures in Mérida (state)
Tourist attractions in Mérida (state)